The second season of the South Korean reality television competition show K-pop Star premiered on SBS on November 18, 2012, airing Sunday evenings at 4:55 pm KST as part of the Good Sunday lineup. Yoon Do-hyun returned as host and narrator, and Boom returned as live host. Yang Hyun-suk, Park Jin-young, and BoA returned as judges. The season ended on April 6, 2013, with Akdong Musician crowned as winner and chose to sign with YG Entertainment.

Contestants from the Top 10 of Season 2 returned for a special Dream Stage - Best of the Best episode on April 14, 2013, competing with contestants of Season 1 for the title of Overall Champion.

Process 

Audition applications + Preliminary auditions (June - October 2012)
Preliminary auditions were held from around the world in Canada, United States, Australia, and England. 
First round: Talent Audition - Check for talents and skills (Airdate: November 18 - December 2, 2012)
Second round: Ranking Audition - Audition and ranking by judges (Airdate: December 9–23, 2012)
Third round: Casting Audition - Being cast by one of three companies for a two-week training session (Airdate: December 30, 2012 - January 20, 2013)
Fourth round: Battle Audition - Competing for a spot in the Top 10 to advance to the live competition (Airdate: January 27 - February 10, 2013)
Fifth round: Stage Audition - Judges decide and viewers vote during live competition to decide the final winner (Airdate: February 17 - April 7, 2013)

Judges 
Yang Hyun-suk : YG Entertainment CEO, producer, singer
Park Jin-young : JYP Entertainment Executive producer, singer, songwriter
BoA : SM Entertainment singer, dancer, songwriter, record producer

Top 10 
 Akdong Musician : Winner, debuted as duo AKMU under YG Entertainment
 Lee Chan-hyuk : Born 1996, from Uijeongbu
 Lee Soo-hyun : Born 1999, from Uijeongbu
 Bang Ye-dam : Born 2002, from Seoul, Runner-up, signed under YG Entertainment, debuted in boy group Treasure
 Andrew Choi : Born 1980, from Seoul, eliminated March 31, 2013 (6th Live), debuted as soloist under Iconic Sounds
 2,000 Won : eliminated March 24, 2013 (5th Live), debuted as duo under Reve Entertainment
 Kim Hyo-bin : Born 1990, from Gyeonggi-do
 Kim Il-do : Born 1990, from Gyeonggi-do
 Raccoon Boys : eliminated March 17, 2013 (4th Live)
 Brian Shin : Born 1995, from Cupertino, United States, releasing music as brian mantra
 Kim Min-seok : Born 1991, from Asan, signed under NH Media
 McKay Kim : Born 1993, from San Diego, United States, debuted as soloist under Dorothy Company
 Shin Ji-hoon : Born 1998, eliminated March 10, 2013 (3rd Live), debuted as soloist under Cube Entertainment and now under Starline Entertainment. Joined The Unit
 YouU : eliminated March 3, 2013 (2nd Live)
 Jun Min-joo : Born 1994, from Seoul, debuted in girl group The Ark under Music K Entertainment, formerly under Maroo Entertainment in duo KHAN
 Lee Mi-rim : Born 1995, from Seongnam, debuted in girl group TINT under GH Entertainment
 Park So-yeon : Born 1999, from Namyangju, signed under LOEN Entertainment, later participated in Produce 101, debuted as a soloist in December 2020 under GCSC Company
 Son Yu-ji : Born 1998, from Bucheon, signed under DSP Media, later participated in Kara Project, now under GH Entertainment
 Song Ha-ye : Born 1994, from Seoul, debuted as soloist under Hello Music and now under Plus Media Entertainment
 Choi Ye-geun : Born 1997, from Pyeongtaek, eliminated March 3, 2013 (2nd Live), debuted as soloist under Reve Entertainment
 Sung Su-jin : Born 1989, from Seoul, eliminated February 24, 2013 (1st Live), signed under Crazy Sound
 Lee Jin-woo : Born 1990, from United States, eliminated February 24, 2013 (1st Live), debuted as soloist JL

Round 5: Stage Auditions 
 For Rounds 1 to 3, the Top 10 competes 1:1 on the live stage with the results determined by the judges. One contestant from each group is chosen to proceed to the next round. As of Round 4, the Judges Score 70% and Viewers SMS Vote 30% are combined to eliminate the contestant with the lowest score.
 For Rounds 1 to 3, the contestants not chosen will go through live SMS voting by viewers, where the top two contestants (top contestant only after Round 1) proceed to the next round. SMS voting is only allowed for contestants during that groups performance. As of Round 4, SMS voting is allowed throughout all performances.
 Of the remaining contestants, the judges use a "Wild Card" to save one of them in Rounds 1 to 3.

Ratings 
In the ratings below, the highest rating for the show will in be red, and the lowest rating for the show will be in blue. (Note: Individual corner ratings do not include commercial time, which regular ratings include.)

References

External links 
  K-pop Star 2 Official Homepage on SBS The Soty
  

 
2010 South Korean television series debuts